Arkady Yakovlevich Kots (alias - A.Danin, A.Bronin, A.Shatov) (1872, Odessa – 1943) was a Russian socialist poet of Jewish descent.

Arkady (Aaron) Kots graduated from a mining school in Horlivka and worked at the Moscow and Donets Coal Basins. In 1897-1902, Kots resided in Paris, where he graduated from a mining institute and established contact with the revolutionary emigres.

In 1902, he published two poems which would go down into the history of proletarian poetry and movement in general. The first one was a Russian translation of The Internationale, the most famous socialist song and one of the most widely recognized songs in the world. It was published anonymously in a Russian emigre magazine Listki Zhizni, a companion publication to the Zhizn ("Life") magazine. The other verse was called The Proletarian Song (Песнь пролетариев), which would become quite popular.

In 1903, Arkady Kots joined the Russian Social Democratic Labour Party and carried out party assignments in Mariupol and Odessa. In 1907-1914, Kots did not belong to any political party. In 1907, a publishing house Nash Golos (Наш голос) published a collection of verses by Arkady Kots named Proletarian Songs (Песни пролетариев), which would be immediately confiscated by the tsarist authorities. Kots is known to have translated a play by Octave Mirbeau called Les Mauvais Bergers and published a number of political brochures. In 1914-1920, he sided with the Mensheviks.

Evacuated to the east during the Nazi invasion of the Soviet Union, Kots died in 1943.

References 

1872 births
1943 deaths
Writers from Odesa
People from Odessky Uyezd
Odesa Jews
Russian Social Democratic Labour Party members
Mensheviks
Jewish poets
Russian male poets
Soviet poets